Margherita College, established in 1978, is a general degree college situated at Margherita, in Tinsukia district, Assam. This college is affiliated with the Dibrugarh University. This college offers general degree courses in science, arts and commerce.

References

External links
http://mrgcollege.co.in

Universities and colleges in Assam
Colleges affiliated to Dibrugarh University
Educational institutions established in 1978
1978 establishments in Assam